The Mayor of Vasai-Virar is the first citizen of the Indian city of Vasai-Virar. This person is the chief of the Vasai Virar Municipal Corporation of Vasai-Virar region, but the role is largely ceremonial as the real powers are vested in the post of the Municipal Commissioner currently held by D. Gangadhar. The Mayor also plays a functional role in deliberating over the discussions in the Corporation.

Rajeev Patil alias Nana first held this post after creation. Other local leaders like Praveena Thakur, wife of four time member of Maharashtra Legislative Assembly Hitendra Thakur of Bahujan Vikas Aaghadi and Narayan Mankar of the same party have held this post amongst others.

Sport Culture

The Vasai-Virar City Municipal Corporation has been conducting the celebrated annual marathon under the banner of Vasai Virar Mayor's Marathon since 2010.

Mayors of Vasai-Virar 
1 June 2010 - 27 December 2012: Shri. Rajeev Patil
1 January 2013 – Present: Shri. Narayan Mankar
1 January 2021 - Pravin Shetty

Vasai-Virar
Mayors of places in Maharashtra